The 1930 FA Charity Shield was the 17th FA Charity Shield, an annual football match.  It was played between Arsenal (1929–30 FA Cup winners) and Sheffield Wednesday (1929–30 Football League champions) at Stamford Bridge in London on 8 October 1930.  Arsenal won the match 2–1.

Match details
Arsenal took the lead through Hulme, and doubled their advantage before half-time when Jack scored.  Sheffield Wednesday scored a consolation goal when Burgess converted a penalty awarded for a Jack handball, and the match ended 2–1.

References

FA Community Shield
Charity Shield
Charity Shield
Charity Shield 1930
Charity Shield 1930